Åraksbø is a village in Bygland municipality in Agder county, Norway. The population (2001) of the Åraksbø area was 89.

Sandnes Church has been located in this village since 1935, prior to that time, it was located in the village of Sandnes, a few kilometers to the south.

References

Villages in Agder
Bygland